(RED)Wire is an online magazine and music service created by Bono (of the Irish rock band U2) and Bobby Shriver. It is a part of the broader Product RED organization, which serves to work with corporations who are contracted to give a percentage of their profits for particular products to the Global Fund to fight HIV/AIDS in Africa. (RED)Wire was created on World AIDS Day on December 1, 2006. Each issue contains an exclusive song from a major artist and a "spotlight" song from an up-and-coming artist, as well as other non-music media, such as video clips, poems, and so on.

A full subscription costs the user $5 per month, half of which goes to the Global Fund and the other half going to the artists and producers involved, thus creating a sustainable business. Users can sign up to receive two free issues of the magazine. The magazine is currently only available for users in the United States and the United Kingdom.Currently (RED)Wire does not offer previous issues for purchase, but negotiations with the labels to be able to offer them are ongoing.

Issues of the magazine are retrieved and displayed by a custom Adobe Air application.

Featured songs

List of contributing artists
U2
John Legend
Elton John
The Killers
Elvis Costello
R.E.M.
Sheryl Crow
Coldplay
Bob Dylan
Emmylou Harris
Death Cab for Cutie
Jenny Lewis
Keith Urban
Ziggy Marley
Cat Power
Faith Hill
Jimmy Fallon
Michael Franti
Jay-Z
Kylie Minogue
Joseph Arthur and the Lonely Astronauts
Neil Tennant
The Dixie Chicks
The Police

References

External links

Online music magazines published in the United States
Magazines established in 2006